Diiodomethane or methylene iodide, commonly abbreviated "MI", is an organoiodine compound. Diiodomethane is a colorless liquid; however, it decomposes upon exposure to light liberating iodine, which colours samples brownish.  It is slightly soluble in water, but soluble in organic solvents. It has a relatively high refractive index of 1.741, and a surface tension of 0.0508 N·m−1.

Uses
Because of its high density, diiodomethane is used in the determination of the density of mineral and other solid samples.  It can also be used as an optical contact liquid, in conjunction with the gemmological refractometer, for determining the refractive index of certain gemstones. 

Diiodomethane is a reagent for installing the CH2 group. In the Simmons–Smith reaction, it is a source of methylene. In fact the Simmons–Smith reaction does not produce free carbene but proceeds via Zn-CH2I intermediates.

Diiodomethane is also a source of the equivalent of CH22+.  The synthesis of Fe2(CH2)(CO)8 illustrates this reactivity:
Na2Fe2(CO)8  +  CH2I2 → Fe2(CH2)(CO)8  +  2NaI

Preparation
Diiodomethane can be prepared from the widely available solvent dichloromethane by the action of sodium iodide in acetone in the Finkelstein reaction:
CH2Cl2 + 2 NaI   →   CH2I2 + 2 NaCl

It can also be prepared by reducing iodoform with elemental phosphorus or sodium arsenite:
CHI3  +  Na3AsO3  +  NaOH   →   CH2I2  +  NaI  +  Na3AsO4

Safety
Alkyl iodides are alkylating agents, which are potential mutagens.

References

External links
 Diiodomethane data sheet
 New particle formation from photooxidation of diiodomethane 

Iodoalkanes
Halomethanes
Halogenated solvents